Dhafir Smith (born September 23, 1982) is an American professional boxer.

Professional career
In December 2010, Smith had a huge upset over former world champion Jeff Lacy.

On March 18, 2011 Smith lost to Jesús González in a bout for the vacant IBF North American super middleweight title. González was coming off of an almost three year layoff.

Professional boxing record

References

External links

Super-middleweight boxers
1982 births
Living people
Boxers from Pennsylvania
American male boxers